Melrose Hill is a neighborhood in Los Angeles. A portion of the neighborhood is designated as a Historic Preservation Overlay Zone.

Geography
Melrose Hill is located north of Melrose Avenue, south of Santa Monica Blvd., east of Western Avenue, and west of the Hollywood Freeway.

The city of Los Angeles has installed neighborhood signs to mark the neighborhood boundaries, with signs located at Western Avenue and Santa Monica Boulevard, Western Avenue and Marathon Street and Western Avenue and Melrose Avenue.  There is also a sign at Melrose Avenue and Ardmore Street.

Hollywood is located to the north, and the intersection of Western Avenue and Santa Monica Boulevard "splits the two neighborhoods".

Though the Los Angeles Times Mapping Project places Melrose Hill in larger neighborhood of East Hollywood, the City of Los Angeles does not place Melrose Hill within East Hollywood Neighborhood Council  and instead places it within the Hollywood Studio District Neighborhood Council

History

Sidney L. Briggs and M.P. Gilbert first acquired and developed the area in 1906. Lot prices started at $425. Wilshire District developer Avery McCarthy christened the main thoroughfare Melrose Avenue, after his family’s hometown of Melrose, Mass., and named the highest point in the tract—about 337 feet above sea level—Melrose Hill.

Melrose Hill HPOZ

 
Within Melrose Hill is the Melrose Hill Historic Preservation Overlay Zone (HPOZ). The HPOZ covers homes on Marathon Street (between Hobart Boulevard and Oxford Avenue), North Melrose Hill Street and West Melrose Hill Street.  HPOZ signage is installed at the intersection of Hobart Boulevard and Marathon Street.

The neighborhood's historic status was designated by the city in 1988.  The 42 residences within the HPOZ are modest Craftsman and Colonial Revival bungalows built between 1911 and 1926.

The neighborhood streetlamps are made  from the same mold that was used at the turn of the 20th century to supply the lighting towers for New York's Central Park.  The streetlights were installed in 1980  and spurred the movement for the neighborhood to seek historic status.

In January 2003, Los Angeles magazine profiled the Melrose Hill HPOZ and named it one of the city's "10 Great Neighborhoods You've Never Heard Of."

Parks and recreation

 Lemon Grove Recreation Center, 4959 Lemon Grove Avenue

References

Neighborhoods in Los Angeles